Kirill Igorevich Lyapunov (born 24 March 1986) is a Russian canoeist. Competing in the four-man K-4 1000 m event he won a silver medal at the 2016 European Championships and placed ninth at the Rio Olympics.

References

1986 births
Living people
Russian male canoeists
Olympic canoeists of Russia
Canoeists at the 2016 Summer Olympics